Shafi Ahmed Chowdhury Qureshi is a Bangladeshi businessman and politician. He is a two-time Member of Parliament elected from Sylhet-3 seat in the Bangladesh National Parliamentary Election. He was elected a member of the Jatiya Sangsad in the February 1996 elections and the October 2001 elections.

Birth and early life 
Shafi Ahmed Chowdhury was born into a Bengali Muslim family in South Surma of Sylhet District, Bangladesh. The family claimed descent from Banu Ummayya of the Arab Quresh tribe.

Career 
In his personal life he is a businessman.

Political life 
He participated in all the elections from that 1986 year. He did not join 2014 Election the party in the decision. elected a member of the Jatiya Sangsad in the February 1996 elections and the October 2001 elections. He was defeated in the 1986, 1991, June 1996, 2008 and 2018 election.

See also 
 February 1996 Bangladeshi general election
 2001 Bangladeshi general election

References 

Bangladesh Nationalist Party politicians
6th Jatiya Sangsad members
8th Jatiya Sangsad members
People from Dakshin Surma Upazila
Bangladeshi businesspeople
Bangladeshi people of Arab descent
21st-century Bengalis
20th-century Bengalis